"Electric Avenue" is a song written, recorded and produced by British singer and songwriter Eddy Grant, who released it on his 1982 album Killer on the Rampage. In the United States, with the help of the MTV video he shot for it, it was one of the biggest hits of 1983. The song refers to Electric Avenue in London, and to the 1981 Brixton riot in the Brixton district of the city.

Composition
The title of the song refers to Electric Avenue in the south London district of Brixton, the first market street to be lit by electricity. According to Grant he first became aware of the existence of the street during a stint acting at the Black Theatre of Brixton. The area is now known for its high population of Caribbean immigrants. At the beginning of the 1980s, as identified by the Scarman Report, tensions over unemployment, racism and poverty exacerbated by racist policing culminated in the street events now known as the 1981 Brixton riot. Grant, horrified and enraged, wrote and composed a song in response to these events. Shortly after, Grant left the UK to live in Barbados, and his most recent batch of songs was lost during baggage transit. ‘Electric Avenue’ was one of the songs he wrote immediately afterwards to make up for the lost material.

Music video
Filmed in Barbados, the song's music video helped it to gain popularity in the United States. In the early years of MTV, the network ran music videos almost exclusively by white artists and was criticized by famous musicians, such as David Bowie, for not having black artists on the network. After "Billie Jean" aired and was successful, MTV soon scrambled to get other black artists into their rotation. Once "Electric Avenue" aired, it did not take long for the song to climb up to the No. 2 spot on the Billboard Hot 100.

Other release information
The original B-Side to this song was a non-LP track entitled "Time Warp". The 45 sold more than one million copies in the United States, earning a platinum certification. It was later re-issued with "I Don't Want to Dance" as the flip side.

In 2001, Peter Black remixed "Electric Avenue" as the "Ringbang Remix", which was released on 28 May 2001. The single featured and reached number 5 in the UK Singles Chart in June 2001, as well as number 16 on the US Dance Chart.

Reception
Grant initially released it as a single in 1983, and reached No. 2 on the UK Singles Chart. In 1983, CBS decided to launch the single in the U.S., where it spent five weeks at No. 2 on Billboard Magazine's Hot 100 charts and hit No. 1 in Cash Box Magazine. (It was kept out of the No. 1 spot on Billboard's Hot 100 by two different songs: first by "Flashdance... What a Feeling" by Irene Cara and then by that year's song of the summer, "Every Breath You Take" by the Police.) "Electric Avenue" was a hit on two other US charts: On the soul chart it went to No. 18, and on the dance charts, it peaked at No. 6. It was nominated for a Grammy Award as Best R&B Song of 1983, but lost to Michael Jackson's "Billie Jean".

Grant sued former president Donald Trump and his administration over the use of the song in an advertisement in 2020.

Charts

Weekly charts

Original version

Ringbang Remix

Year-end charts

Refugee Camp All-Stars version

In 1997, Refugee Camp All-Stars covered the song for the original soundtrack of the movie Money Talks. This cover was titled "Avenues" and featured reggae artist Ky-Mani Marley.

Charts

Year-end charts

See also

List of Cash Box Top 100 number-one singles of 1983
List of number-one singles of 1983 (Canada)

References

External links

1982 songs
1983 singles
1997 singles
Cashbox number-one singles
Eddy Grant songs
EMI Records singles
Funk songs
Music videos directed by Steve Barron
Parlophone singles
Portrait Records singles
Protest songs
RPM Top Singles number-one singles
Songs about poverty
Songs about London
Songs written by Eddy Grant